Marko Tadić (born 15 April 1995) is a Serbian footballer, who plays for FK Sutjeska Foča.

Club career
Born in Zrenjanin, Tadić started his career with Borac Šajkaš in lower ranks of the Serbian football system. In the winter break off 2015–16 season, he moved to Novi Sad-Syrmia Zone league club Mladost Bački Jarak along with coach Dragan Milošević. Shortly after he joined the club he came into the first squad, contributing to winning Vojvodina regional cup. Pursuant to the success, the club qualified to the Serbian Cup, where Tadić made an appearance in the first round match against Novi Pazar. In summer 2016, Tadić was also called into the amateur squad under Football Association of Vojvodina for the UEFA Regions' Cup. After he spent the whole 2016 with Mladost Bački Jarak as one on the most productive players, Tadić left the club and moved to Serbian First League side ČSK Čelarevo at the beginning of 2017. After several months with the club, Tadić left in summer same year and moved to Modriča.

In August 2020, Tadić joined FK Sutjeska Foča.

Career statistics

Club

References

1995 births
Living people
Sportspeople from Zrenjanin
Association football midfielders
Serbian footballers
Serbian expatriate footballers
FK ČSK Čelarevo players
FK Modriča players
FK Sutjeska Foča players
Serbian First League players
First League of the Republika Srpska players
Serbian expatriate sportspeople in Bosnia and Herzegovina
Expatriate footballers in Bosnia and Herzegovina